The Zastava CZ99 is a semi-automatic pistol produced by Zastava Arms. It was developed in 1989 to replace the M57 in the Yugoslav military and police. The CZ 99 is primarily chambered in 9×19mm Parabellum with a 15-round magazine, although .40 Smith & Wesson variants also exist, with ten round magazines.

Design
The pistol was designed in 1989 by Božidar Blagojević. The CZ99 should not be confused with the Czech firearm manufacturer Česká Zbrojovka, because the CZ in the CZ99's name stands for "Crvena Zastava". The CZ99 replaced the outdated Zastava M57 in Yugoslavian military service becuase of its many new features, such as a fully chromed barrel, tritium night sights, an indicator for the last three rounds remaining in the magazine and a loaded chamber indicator. The CZ99 is still used in military and police service throughout the Balkans. The CZ99 is no longer produced, however, smaller variants with some modern improvements, the CZ999 and the EZ9, are still being produced.

Visually, the pistol resembles a SIG-Sauer P226 and, as such, it is often compared to the SIG. However, the overall design of the pistol took far more inspiration from the Walther P88 than the P226. Some of the P88 features that were used on the CZ99 include similar slide serrations, magazine, magazine release, and, of course, the ambidextrous combined safety-decocker. Also unlike the P226, the CZ99 also has a machined steel slide. The P226 (at the time of this pistol's design) had a stamped and welded sheet steel slide. The external appearance of the gun and lack of an external extractor were design ideas taken from the P226.

Variants

CZ999 Scorpion (ЦЗ999): An updated variant of the CZ99 with some improvements, such as a slimmer grip, wider slide serrations, curved trigger, square trigger guard and a longer hammer spur. While initially intended for the 9×19mm, there is a variant of the CZ99 chambered in .40 S&W, primarily for foreign importers, with many of these handguns imported by the US in 1990. Over time though, newer versions of this firearm have been developed: The Zastava CZ999, with DAO and DA/SA selector, as well as the CZ999 Scorpion without this selector. Also features a loaded chamber indicator. Comes in compact model as well.
Zastava EZ is the fourth generation CZ99, with an under-barrel picatinny rail for mounting lights and accessories and a larger ring hammer. Service- and personal defence gun, single/double action, ambidextrous. Exists in two calibers. There are compact versions of both calibers.
KSN Golan is an Israeli clone of the CZ99, with rights being purchased after Zastava halted production. Though the Golan lacks the CZ99’s loaded chamber indicator and has a shorter slide and barrel, different grips, and other minor cosmetic variations from the CZ99, it is virtually identical in internal design, and some parts are interchangeable between the two.
Tressitu TZ99 is a South African clone of the CZ99. In the early 1990s South African company Tressitu entered into a licensing agreement with Crvena Zastava to produce a licensed copy named the TZ99, offered in both 9x19mm and .40 S&W. It was only produced for a short period before the company went out of business in the mid-1990s. A number of TZ99s stored from the dissolution were imported to the US in the mid-2000s.

Users

See also
 SIG Sauer P226
 Zastava PPZ - CZ99's successor

References

External links

Semi-automatic pistols of Serbia
9mm Parabellum semi-automatic pistols
Zastava Arms
.40 S&W semi-automatic pistols
Weapons and ammunition introduced in 1990